Shahbag or Shahbagh (also Shahbaugh) is a major neighbourhood and a police precinct or thana in Dhaka, the capital and largest city of Bangladesh. It is also a major public transport hub. It is a junction between two contrasting sections of the city—Old Dhaka and New Dhaka—which lie, respectively, to its south and north. Developed in the 17th century during Mughal rule in Bengal, when Old Dhaka was the provincial capital and a centre of the flourishing muslin industry, it came to neglect and decay in early 19th century. In the mid-19th century, the Shahbag area was developed as New Dhaka became a provincial centre of the British Raj, ending a century of decline brought on by the passing of Mughal rule.

Shahbag is the location of the nation's leading educational and public institutions, including the University of Dhaka, the oldest and largest public university in Bangladesh, Dhaka Medical College, the largest medical college in the country, Bangabandhu Sheikh Mujib Medical University (BSMMU), and the Bangladesh University of Engineering and Technology, the largest public university for technological studies in the country. Shahbag hosts many street markets and bazaars. Since Bangladesh achieved independence in 1971, the Shahbag area has become a venue for celebrating major festivals, such as the Bengali New Year and Basanta Utsab.

Shahbag's numerous ponds, palaces and gardens have inspired the work of writers, singers, and poets.  With Dhaka University at its centre, the thana has been the origin of major political movements in the nation's 20th century history, including the All India Muslim Education Conference in 1905, which led to the All India Muslim League. In 1947, to both the partition of India and the creation of Pakistan; the Bengali Language Movement in 1952, which led to the recognition of Bengali as an official language of Pakistan; and the Six point movement in 1966, which led to the nation's independence. It was here, on 7 March 1971, that Sheikh Mujibur Rahman delivered a historic speech calling for the independence of Bangladesh from Pakistan, and here too, later that year, that the Pakistani Army surrendered in the Liberation War of Bangladesh. The area has since become a staging ground for protests by students and other groups. It was the site of public protests by around 30,000 civilians on 8 February 2013, against a lenient ruling against war criminals.

Etymology
The neighborhood was originally named Bagh-e-Badshahi (Persian for Garden of Kings), but later came to be called by the shortened name Shah (Persian:شاه, king) Bagh (Persian: باغ, garden).

History 

Although urban settlements in the Dhaka area date back to the seventh century CE, the earliest evidence of urban construction in the Shahbag area is to be found at monuments constructed after 1610, when the Mughals turned Dhaka into a provincial capital and established the gardens of Shahbag.  Among these monuments are: the Dhaka Gate, located near the Bangla Academy in Shahbag, and erected by Mir Jumla, the Mughal subadar of Bengal from 1660 to 1663; the Mariam Saleha Mosque, a three-domed Mughal-style mosque in Nilkhet-Babupara, constructed in 1706; the Musa Khan Mosque on the western side of Dhaka University, likely constructed in the late 17th century; and the Khwaja Shahbaz's Mosque-Tomb, located behind the Dhaka High Court and built in 1679 by Khwaja Shahbaz, a merchant-prince of Dhaka during the vice-royalty of Prince Muhammad Azam, the son of Mughal Emperor Aurengzeb. According to legends a sadhu named Gopal Giri, from Badri Narayan, established a Kali temple in Shahbag in the 13th century. Called kaathgarh at the time, it eventually became the Ramna Kali Mandir. Iti s also said that Kedar Rai of Bikrampur, one of the Baro-Bhuyans, apparently built a Kali temple on the site in the late 16th century, and the main temple was built by Haricharan Giri in the early 17th century.

However, with the decline of Mughal power in Bengal, the Shahbag gardens—the Gardens of the Kings—fell into neglect. In 1704, when the provincial capital was moved to Murshidabad, they became the property of the Naib Nazimsthe Deputy-Governors of the sub-province of East Bengaland the representatives of the Nawabs of Murshidabad.  Although British power was established in Dacca in 1757, the upkeep of Shahbag gardens was resumed only in the early 19th century under the patronage of an East India Company judge, Griffith Cook, and P. Aratun. In 1830, the Ramna area, which included Shahbag, was incorporated into Dhaka city consequent to the deliberations of the Dacca Committee (for the development of Dacca town) founded by district collector Henry Walters. A decade later, Nawab Khwaja Alimullah, founder of the Dhaka Nawab Family and father of Nawab Khwaja Abdul Ghani, purchased the Shahbag zamindari (estate) from the East India Company. Upon his death, in 1868, the estate passed to his grandson Nawab Khwaja Ahsanullah. In the early 20th century, Ahsanullah's son, Sir Nawab Khwaja Salimullah, was able to reclaim some of the lost splendour of the gardens by dividing them into two smaller gardens—the present-day Shahbag and Paribag (or, "garden of fairies")—the latter named after Paribanu, one of Ahsanullah's daughters.

With the partition of Bengal in 1905, and with Dacca becoming the capital of the new province of East Bengal, European-style houses were rapidly built in the area, especially along the newly constructed Fuller Road (named after Sir Bampfylde Fuller, the first Lieutenant Governor of East Bengal).  Around this time, the first zoo in the Dhaka area was also established in Shahbag. Rani Bilasmani of Bhawal established a new idol in the Kali temple and excavated a large pond in front of it at this period. In 1924, Anandamayi Ma moved into Shabag and established Anandamayi Asharam inside the 2.22 acres of temple ground.

After the creation of the new nation of Pakistan in 1947, when Dhaka became the capital of East Pakistan, many new buildings were built in the Shahbag area, including, in 1960, the office of Bangladesh Betar, (then Pakistan Radio), the national radio station, the (now-defunct) Dacca race-course, as well as the second electric power-plant in East Bengal.  On 7 March 1971, Sheikh Mujibur Rahman chose the Ramna Racecourse near Shahbag to deliver his speech calling for an independent Bangladesh.  On 27 March 1971, Pakistani Army destroyed the Kali temple and its 120 feet tower. During the ensuing Bangladesh Liberation War, many foreign journalists, including the Associated Press bureau chief in Pakistan, Arnold Zeitlin, and Washington Post reporter, H.D.S. Greenway stayed at Hotel InterContinental (now Hotel Sheraton) at the Shahbag Intersection.  The hotel, which had been declared a neutral zone, nonetheless came under fire from both combatants in the war—the Mukti Bahini and Pakistani army. At the conclusion of the war, the Hotel Intercontinental was at first chosen as the venue for the surrender ceremony of the West Pakistan Army; however, the final surrender ceremony later took place in the nearby Ramna Park (now Suhrawardy Uddan).

Shahbag is part of the 181st electoral district of Bangladesh: Dhaka 8. In 2008 Bangladeshi general election Rashed Khan Menon of Workers Party of Bangladesh was elected as the member of Jatiyo Sangsad (member of parliament or MP) from the area. In the Dhaka City Corporation ward commissioner election of 2002 Md. Chowdhury Alam (ward 56) and Khaja Habibullah Habib (ward 57) were elected in the Shahbag area.

More than 1,000 people gathered here on 5 February 2013, growing to 20,000 people by 9 February, following the conviction of Abdul Quader Mollah for war crimes by the Bangladesh International Crimes Tribunal, and his sentence to life imprisonment. Protesters thought he should have received the death sentence for his crimes, as had two other political leaders who were convicted. The protest movement gathered force, as leaders also called for the banning of Jamaat-e-Islami from politics, as two of its top leaders had been convicted of war crimes and followers had conducted violent protests and riots. The 2013 Shahbag protests have influenced national politics, and has been called 'Projonmo Chattar'.

Urban layout 

Nearly 80% of the annual average rainfall of  occurs between May and September.

The Shahbag neighbourhood covers a large approximately rectangular area, extending on the east from Ramna Park to the Supreme Court of Bangladesh; on the west as far as Sonargaon Road; on the south as far as Fuller Road and from the University of Dhaka to the Suhrawardy Udyan (formerly, Ramna Racecourse); and on the north as far as Minto Road, Hotel Sheraton and the Diabetic Hospital.

Shahbag is home to the Dhaka Metropolitan Police (DMP) Control Room as well as a Dhaka Electric Supply Authority substation.  The Mausoleum of three leaders Bengali statesman A.K. Fazlul Huq (1873–1962), former Prime Minister of Pakistan, Huseyn Shaheed Suhrawardy (1892–1963), and former Prime Minister and Governor-General of Pakistan, Khwaja Nazimuddin (1894–1964)—are all located in Shahbag. The major academic bodies around Shahbag Intersection and in Shahbag Thana area include: University of Dhaka, Dhaka Medical College, BUET, Bangladesh Civil Service Administration Academy, Bangabandhu Sheikh Mujib Medical University (BSMMU), the only public medical university in the country, Institute of Cost & Management Accountants, IBA, Institute of Modern Languages, Udayan School, University Laboratory School, and the Engineering University School. Other public and educational institutions in the area include  the Bangladesh National Museum, the Central Public Library, and the Shishu Academy, the National Academy for Children.

The Shahbag Intersection, the nerve centre of the neighbourhood, is the location of many Dhaka landmarks.  Well-known ones include Hotel Sheraton (formerly Hotel Intercontinental, the second five-star hotel in Dhaka); the Dhaka Club, the oldest and largest club in Dhaka, established in 1911; the National Tennis Complex; Shishu Park, the oldest children's entertainment park in Dhaka, notable for admitting underprivileged children gratis on weekends; Sakura, the first bar in Dhaka; and Peacock, the first Dhaka bar with outdoor seating. The Shahbag Intersection is one of the major public transportation hubs in Dhaka, along with Farmgate, Gulistan, Mohakhali, and Maghbazar.

The thana also contains a hospitals complex, which is a major destination for Bangladeshis seeking medical treatment. The Diabetic Association of Bangladesh (DAB) is located at the Shahbag Intersection, as are BIRDEM (Bangladesh Institute of Research and Rehabilitation in Diabetes, Endocrine and Metabolic Disorders) and the BIRDEM Hospital.  Flanking BIRDEM hospital is the Ibrahim Memorial Cardiac Hospital, named after Dr Muhammad Ibrahim, the founder of DAB and BIRDEM.  Other facilities in the area are BSMMU Hospital (at the Intersection) and the Dhaka Medical College Hospital at the southern end of Shahbag.

Located at the juncture of two major bus routes – Gulistan to Mirpur and Motijheel to Uttara – Shahbag Intersection serves as a public transport hubs in Dhaka, where the population commutes exclusively by the city bus services. The Intersection also has one of the few taxi stands in Dhaka. The thoroughfares of Shahbag has been made free of cycle-rickshaws, the traditional transport of Dhaka.

Shahbagh Square, also known as Shahbagh Circle, is a major road intersection and public transport hub located in Shahbagh thana. The intersection connects some of the important areas of Dhaka such as Gulshan, and Farmgate. It is also surrounded by some significant landmarks including Bangladesh National Museum, Suhrawardy Udyan, and Bangabandhu Sheikh Mujib Medical University.  Throughout its history, Shahbag square has been a place of protests and demonstrations, most notably the 2013 Shahbag protests.

Historic mansions

Also located in Shahbag are several mansions built by Dhaka Nawab Family in the 19th century.  These mansions not only figured prominently in the history of Dhaka, but also gained mention in the histories of both Bengal and British India.

A well-known Nawab family mansion is the Ishrat Manzil.  Originally, a dance-hall for the performances of Baijees, or dancing women, (including, among the famous ones, Piyari Bai, Heera Bai, Wamu Bai and Abedi Bai), the mansion became the venue for the All-India Muslim Education Society Conference in 1906, which was attended by 4,000 participants.  In 1912, Society convened here again under the leadership of Nawab Salimullah, and met with Lord Hardinge, the Viceroy of India. The Ishrat Manzil was subsequently rebuilt as Hotel Shahbag (designed by British architects Edward Hicks and Ronald McConnel), the first major international hotel in Dhaka. In 1965, the building was acquired by the Institute of Post-graduate Medicine and Research (IPGMR), and later, in 1998, by the Bangabandhu Sheikh Mujib Medical University (BSMMU).

Another Nawab mansion is the Jalsaghar.  Built as a skating rink and a ballroom for the Nawabs, it was later converted into an eatery and meeting place for students and faculty of Dhaka University and renamed Madhur Canteen. In the late 1960s, Madhur Canteen became a focal point for planning student protests against the West Pakistan regime.  Flanked on one side by the Dhaka University's Faculty of Fine Arts and on the other by the Institute of Business Administration (IBA), the Madhur Canteen remains a powerful political symbol.

Nishat Manjil was built as the princely stable and clubhouse for the Nawabs, and served as a venue of receptions for the statesmen of the day, including Lord Dufferin (Viceroy of India), Lord Carmichael (Governor of Bengal), Sir Steuart Bayley (Lt. Governor of Bengal), Sir Charles Alfred Elliott (Lt. Governor of Bengal), and John Woodburn (Lt. Governor of Bengal).

The Nawab's Paribag House was built by Khwaja Salimullah in the memory of his sister, Pari Banu.  Later, with the downturn in the family's fortunes, his son, Nawab Khwaja Habibullah, lived here for many years. The hammam (bath) and the hawakhana (green house) were regarded as marvels of design in the early 20th century.

Sujatpur Palace, the oldest Nawab mansion in the area, later became the residence for the Governor of East Bengal during the Pakistani Regime, and was subsequently turned into the Bangla Academy, the Supreme Bengali Language Authority in Bangladesh.  Some of the palace grounds was handed over to the TSC (Teacher Student Center) of Dhaka University, and became a major cultural and political meeting place in the 1970s.

Culture 

Shahbag is populated by mostly teachers and students, and its civic life is dominated by the activities of its academic institutions.  Its commercial life too reflects its occupants' intellectual and cultural pursuits.  Among its best known markets is the country's largest second-hand, rare, and antiquarian book-market, consisting of Nilkhet-Babupura Hawkers Market, a street market, and Aziz Supermarket, an indoor bazaar. Shahbag is also home to the largest flower market (a street side open air bazaar) in the country, which is located at Shahbag Intersection, as well as the largest pet market in the country, the Katabon Market. In addition, Elephant Road features a large shoe market and, Nilkhet-Babupura, a large market for bedding accessories.

Shahbag's numerous ponds, palaces and gardens have inspired the work of artists, including poet Buddhadeva Bose, singer Protiva Bose, writer-chronicler Hakim Habibur Rahman, and two Urdu poets of 19th-century Dhaka, Obaidullah Suhrawardy and Abdul Gafoor Nassakh.
Shahbag was at the centre of the cultural and political activities associated with the Language movement of 1952, which resulted in the founding here of the Bangla Academy, a national academy for promoting the Bengali language. The first formal art school in Dhakathe Dhaka Art College (now Faculty of Fine Arts)was founded in Shahbag by Zainul Abedin in 1948. Later, Mazharul Islam, the pioneer of modern architecture in Bangladesh, designed the art college as one of his early projects. In the 1970s, Aftabuddin Ahmed and M. M. Yacoob opened Jiraz Art Gallery in the Shahbag area. Other cultural landmarks in the area include
the Bangladesh National Museum, the National Public Library, and the Dhaka University Mosque and Cemetery, containing the graves of Kazi Nazrul Islam, the national poet, of painters Zainul Abedin and Quamrul Hassan, and of the teachers killed by Pakistani forces during the Bangladesh Liberation War of 1971.

The Shahbag area has a rich religious history.  In the late 1920s, Sri Anandamoyi Ma, the noted Hindu ascetic, also known as the Mother of Shahbag, built her ashram near Ramna Kali Mandir, or the Temple of Kali, at Ramna.  Her presence in Dhaka owed directly to Shahbag, for her husband, Ramani Mohan Chakrabarti, had accepted the position of caretaker of Shahbag gardens a few years earlier.  In 1971 the Temple of Kali was destroyed by the Pakistani Army in the Liberation War of Bangladesh. A well-known local Muslim saint of the early 20th century was Syed Abdur Rahim, supervisor of the dairy farm established by Khwaja Salimullah, the Nawab of Dhaka, at Paribag.  Known as the Shah Shahib of Paribag, Abdur Rahim had his khanqah (Persian: خانگاه, spiritual retreat) here; his tomb lies at the same location today. Katabon Mosque, an important centre for Muslim missionaries in Bangladesh, is located in Shahbag as well. In addition, the only Sikh Gurdwara in Dhaka stands next to the Institute of Modern Languages in Shahbag.

Since 1875, the Shahbag gardens have hosted a famous fair celebrating the Gregorian New Year and containing exhibits of agricultural and industrial items, as well as those of animals and birds.  In the late 19th and early 20th centuries, the gardens were the private property of the Nawab of Dhaka, and, although a portion of the gardens had been donated to Dhaka University in 1918, ordinary citizens could enter the main gardens only during the fair. In 1921, at the request of the Nawab's daughter, Paribanu, the organisers of the fair set aside one day during which only women were admitted to the fair, a tradition that has continued down to the present.  Today, the fair features dance recitals by girls, Jatra (a native form of folk theater), putul naach (puppet shows), magic shows and Bioscope shows. Historically, Shahbag was also the main venue in Dhaka for other recreational sports like Boli Khela (wrestling) and horse racing.

The Basanta Utsab (Festival of Spring) takes place every 14 February—the first day of spring, according to the reformed Bangladeshi calendar. Basanta Utsab has become a major festival in Dhaka since it was first celebrated in Shahbag in the 1960s. Face painting, wearing yellow clothes (signifying Spring), music, and local fairs are typical of the many activities associated with the festival, which often also includes themes associated with Valentine's Day.

Shahbag is also a focal point of the Pohela Baishakh (the Bengali New Year) festival, celebrated every 14 April following the revised Bengali Calendar, and now the biggest carnival in Dhaka. From 1965 to 1971 the citizens of Dhaka observed the festival as a day of protest against the Pakistani regime. Other local traditions associated with the festival include the Boishakhi Rally and the Boishakhi Mela begun by the Institute of Fine Arts (now Faculty of Fine Arts) and the Bangla Academy respectively.  In addition, Chayanaut Music School began the tradition of singing at dawn under the Ramna Batamul (Ramna Banyan tree). In 2001, a suicide bomber killed 10 people and injured 50 others during the Pohela Baishakh festivals. The Harkat-ul-Jihad-al-Islami, an Islamic militant group, was alleged to be behind the incident.

Books and movies figure prominently in the cultural life of Shahbag.  The biggest book fair in Bangladesh is held every February on the premises of the Bangla Academy in Shahbag.  The only internationally recognised film festival in Bangladesh—the Short and Independent Film Festival, Bangladesh—takes place every year at the National Public Library premises.  The organisers of the film festival, the Bangladesh Short Film Forum, have their offices in Aziz Market. Aparajeyo Bangla, a sculpture in memory of Bangladesh Liberation War, is also in Shahbag.

Notes

References
 
 
 Old files and documents preserved at Ahsan Manzil Museum and Nawab State's Office
 Ahsanullah, Nawab, Personal Diary (Urdu) preserved at Ahsan Manzil.

External links

 
 Anandamoyi Ma website

Neighbourhoods in Dhaka
Thanas of Dhaka